J21 or J-21 may refer to:

Vehicles

Aircraft 
 Junkers J 21, a German reconnaissance aircraft
 SAAB J 21, a Swedish fighter
 Shenyang J-21, a Chinese prototype fighter
 Soko J-21 Jastreb, a Yugoslav light attack aircraft

Locomotives 
 LNER Class J21, a British steam locomotive class

Ships 
 , a Bangor-class minesweeper of the Royal Navy and Royal Canadian Navy
 , an Östergötland-class destroyer of the Swedish Navy
 , a survey ship of the Indian Navy

Other uses 
 Bronchiolitis
 County Route J21 (California)
 Elongated pentagonal rotunda, a Johnson solid (J21)